Karla Ruiz McFarland is a Mexican politician who served as the 28th mayor of Tijuana. A member of the National Regeneration Movement, she is the first female mayor of Tijuana and the former Secretary of Municipal Education.

Early life and education 
Ruiz McFarland is the daughter of Guillermo Ruiz Hernández, the current Attorney General of Baja California. She attended Our Lady of Peace, a private Catholic high school in San Diego, and graduated from the Ibero-American University Tijuana with a bachelor's degree in Communications.

Early career 
Before entering politics, she worked at marketing agencies and at news outlets, including for TV Azteca and PSN. She also founded El Foro de Baja California, a newspaper specializing in Law, and served as Director of Public Relations at her family's law firm.

In 2019, she joined the municipal cabinet as head of the Municipal Education Secretariat.

Mayor of Tijuana 
Ruiz McFarland was appointed mayor of Tijuana on October 16, 2020, after then-mayor Arturo González Cruz briefly stepped down to seek the state government candidacy for his Morena political party. Her term ended momentarily on November 5 when González resumed his mayoral duties while awaiting a decision on his nomination. On February 12, 2021, she returned to the mayor's office after González's resignation. She left the post on September 29.

References 

Living people
21st-century Mexican politicians
21st-century Mexican women politicians
Morena (political party) politicians
Women mayors of places in Mexico
Municipal presidents of Tijuana
Universidad Iberoamericana alumni
Politicians from Tijuana
Year of birth missing (living people)